Leah Flanagan is an Australian singer-songwriter from Darwin, Northern Territory, currently based in Sydney. She has released two albums and has toured through Australia with her music and as a part of festival ensembles.
She has also appeared on the Australian TV shows Spicks & Specks, Faboriginal and RocKwiz.

Biography
Flanagan studied classical music at the Elder Conservatorium of Music in Adelaide.

Flanagan has collaborated with Sinead O'Connor, Meshell Ndegeocello, poet Sam Wagan Watson, The Black Arm Band, Paul Kelly and Ursula Yovich, and recorded a duet with Marlon Williams of Archie Roach’s "I’ve Lied". She has featured on the ABC's Spicks and Specks and SBS's Rockwiz, as well as the production 1967: Music in the Key of Yes alongside Dan Sultan, Adalita and Ursula Yovich.

Background/history
Flanagan is a singer-songwriter and guitarist from Darwin in the far north of Australia. She identifies as biracial due to her Aboriginal (Alyawarre), Italian (Venetian), and Irish heritage.
She graduated from the Elder Conservatorium of Music in Adelaide with a degree in Classical Music.
From 2009 to 2011, Leah performed in the productions Murundak, Hidden Republic, and Dirtsong with the touring company The Black Arm Band at many major festivals across Australia. Her performances in this period included one at the 2010 Vancouver Winter Olympics.

In 2010 she appeared at the Melbourne International Arts Festival's production Seven Songs To Leave Behind  with John Cale, Rickie Lee Jones, Sinead O'Connor, Meshell Ndegeocello, and Gurrumul with Black Arm Band members Ursula Yovich, Dan Sultan,  and Shellie Morris. 

Leah was invited by Deborah Conway to be part of her Song Trails project for the 2009 and 2011 Queensland Music Festivals, which led to her collaborating with Australian artists Peter Farnan (Boom Crash Opera), Robert Forster (The Go-Betweens) and Rebecca Barnard (Rebecca's Empire) to deliver a series of workshops and to perform concerts across regional Queensland.

Leah composed a show entitled Midnight Muses, based on the work of award-winning Brisbane poet Samuel Wagan-Watson, for the Adelaide Cabaret Festival.  It premiered in 2011 and later appeared at the 2013 Sydney Festival. 

She was invited to perform as a featured soloist in the first Australian production of Leonard Bernstein's MASS at the 2012 Adelaide Festival. 

In late 2015 Leah was invited by Archie Roach to record a duet of his song "I've Lied" with Marlon Williams for the 25th Anniversary release of Charcoal Lane. Rolling Stone gave the anniversary album 4 1/2 stars. 

Leah is an ambassador for APRA AMCOS.

Collaborations and projects
Mission Songs Project
Buried Country
Black Arm Band
1967: Songs in the Key of Yes
Exiles
Seven Songs To Leave Behind
Midnight Muses
MASS
Liberty Songs
Songtrails

Television
Leah has appeared on the Australian TV music quiz shows Spicks and Specks and RocKwiz; on the latter performing Elvis Costello's Shipbuilding in a duet with multiple ARIA Award winning composer David Bridie. She has also appeared on the light comedy sports programme Marngrook Footy Show, performing a version of Stevie Wonder's For Once in My Life.

Discography

Studio albums

Extended plays

Awards and nominations

National Indigenous Music Awards
The National Indigenous Music Awards (NIMA) recognize contributions to the Northern Territory music industry. It commenced in 2004.

! 
|-
! scope="row" rowspan="1"| 2021
| Colour by Number
| Album of the Year
| 
| 
|}

References

External links
Black Arm Band Bio
Leah Flanagan website

Living people
Australian women singer-songwriters
Indigenous Australian musicians
Year of birth missing (living people)
Singers from Sydney